Lena Cymbrowitz (January 1, 1957 – August 21, 2000) was an American politician who served as a Democratic member of the New York State Assembly. She represented Assembly District 45, which included the Brooklyn communities of Flatbush, Midwood, Sheepshead Bay, Manhattan Beach, Gerritsen Beach, and a portion of Brighton Beach.

Early life and family
Cymbrowitz (née Azizo) was born in Egypt and came to the United States with her parents, Albert Azizo and Lilianne Tawil Tawil Azizo. She had a Bachelor's degree in English Literature. Prior to her election she worked in fundraising and marketing. Cymbrowitz had two children (Jay and Jennifer) with her husband Steven Cymbrowitz. She died on August 21, 2000, after a long battle with cancer. While in office, she had advocated for increasing monies allocated for mammographs.

Career
In November 1998, following a New York Times endorsement in a September primary, about which they commented that "nomination is tantamount to election" she was elected in the 45th District's general election to the New York State Assembly, receiving over 70% of the votes cast. to replace former Assemblyman Daniel Feldman. This made her the first Sephardic Jew ever elected to state office. She died just more than halfway through her first elected term in office. The Lena Cymbrowitz Distinguished Legislator Award was named in her memory.

References

1957 births
2000 deaths
20th-century American Jews
20th-century American politicians
American people of Egyptian-Jewish descent
Deaths from cancer in New York (state)
Egyptian emigrants to the United States
Egyptian Jews
Jewish American state legislators in New York (state)
Jewish women politicians
Democratic Party members of the New York State Assembly